RemotePC is a remote access and remote control software application, developed and owned by IDrive Inc., a software company based in Calabasas, California, United States. Its core function is in enabling remote access and maintenance to computers and other devices. The first version of the software was released in early 2017.

Overview
RemotePC software was created by the team of IDrive Inc., a private technology company based in Calabasas, California. The app was specifically developed for remote communication and control functions, including text chat, voice, RemotePC Meeting, interactive annotation and more.
  
Remote PC software has been discussed and cited in the technology reviews and by the multiple industry outlets such as Software Advice, Capterra, GetApp (Gartner's subsidiary), TechRadar and PCMag,  among others.
The application's use accelerated in 2020 and 2021 as the demand for remote work, learning and communication grew during the COVID-19 pandemic.

Technology and functionality
The app's technology uses TLS v 1.2/AES-256 encryption AES-256 for exchanging data between devices and is compliant with HIPAA and GDPR protocols. It doesn't require any special software for installation and can be accessed directly via the web.
According to the GitHub stats, the first version of the RemotePC software was released in January 2017. The application is written in Python (85.9%), HTML (13.1%) and CSS (1%). RemotePC is compatible with PCs and Macs and Linux systems, and has mobile applications for iOS and Android devices. Its main functions include RemotePC Consumer and SoHo, RemotePC Team, RemotePC Enterprise, RemotePC HelpDesk, RemotePC Meeting and RemotePC ScreenShare.

See also
 Comparison of remote desktop software
 RFB protocol
 Remote Desktop Services

References

RemotePC 

2017 software
Virtual Network Computing
Remote administration software
Remote desktop
Windows remote administration software
MacOS remote administration software
Linux remote administration software